A happening is a performance, event or situation meant to be considered art.

Happening, Happenings, or The Happening may  also refer to:
 Happenings (Hank Jones and Oliver Nelson album) (1966)
 Happenings (Bobby Hutcherson album) (1966)
 The Happenings, an American pop music group that originated in the 1960s
 The Happening (1967 film), a comedy film starring Anthony Quinn
 The Happening (1967 soundtrack)
 "The Happening" (song), a song by the Supremes from the soundtrack 
 The Happening (2008 film), a film by M. Night Shyamalan
 The Happening (2008 soundtrack)
 "Happening" (song), a 2012 song by Medina from Forever
 "The Happening", a 1990 song by the Pixies from Bossanova
 Happening (novel), a 2000 novel by Annie Ernaux
 Happening (film), a 2021 film by Audrey Diwan based on the novel